Ben Walton (born 12 November 1979) is a former Australian rules footballer who played with St Kilda in the Australian Football League (AFL).

Walton played his early football at Trinity College (Gawler) and Central District, prior to being selected by St Kilda with pick 16 of the 1997 National Draft. He didn't play senior football in 1998 but made 18 league appearances in the 1999 AFL season, as a utility player. Over the next two seasons he added just five more games to his tally and was delisted.

He returned to Central District after his AFL career ended and in 2004 he began playing for another SANFL club, North Adelaide.

References

External links
 
 

1979 births
Living people
Australian rules footballers from South Australia
St Kilda Football Club players
Central District Football Club players
North Adelaide Football Club players